Like a River (1993) is the ninth studio album (10th overall) from the jazz group Yellowjackets, and their fifth studio album (sixth overall) for GRP Records. The album was nominated for "Best Contemporary Jazz Recording" Grammy Award.The album reached a peak position of number three on Billboard Top Contemporary Jazz Albums chart.

The tracks "My Old School" and "Dewey (for Miles)" are frequently included in Yellowjackets' set lists, the former being included in their live album "Twenty Five."

The album is dedicated to the memory of Jeff Porcaro, who had died in 1992.

Track listing

Personnel 
Yellowjackets
 Russell Ferrante – acoustic piano, synthesizers
 Jimmy Haslip – 6-string bass, Tobias semi-hollow body electric bass, vocals
 Will Kennedy – drums
 Bob Mintzer – soprano saxophone, tenor saxophone, bass clarinet, EWI

Guest Musicians
 Steve Croes – Synclavier
 Naná Vasconcelos – percussion, vocals
 Judd Miller – EWI programming
 Tim Hagens – trumpet
 Bill Gable – vocals

Production 
 Yellowjackets – producers
 Mick Guzauski –  recording engineer, mixing 
 Bill Jackson – overdub engineer
 Michael Verdick – additional mixing
 Chad Blinman – assistant overdub engineer, mix assistant 
 Gil Morales – assistant engineer
 Kevin Gray – mastering
 Michael Pollard – GRP production coordinator
 Sally G. Poppe – production coordinator
 Joseph Doughney – post-production
 Michael Landy – post-production
 Adam Zelinka – post-production
 Andy Baltimore – GRP creative director
 Margi Denton (Denton Design Associates) – design
 Elizabeth Burrill (Denton Design Associates) –  design
 Richard Laird – photography
 Gary Borman – artist management

Studios
 Recorded at  Conway Recording Studios (Los Angeles, CA).
 Overdubs recorded at The Complex (Los Angeles, CA)
 Mixed at The Complex (Los Angeles, CA).
 Mastered at Location Recording Service (Burbank, CA).
 Post-Production at The Review Room (New York, NY).

Charts

References

1993 albums
Yellowjackets albums
GRP Records albums
Instrumental albums